Kenneth Brown (born 20 August 1940 – ) was a British guitarist with The Quarrymen, a precursor to The Beatles.

Early life 
Brown was born in Enfield, Middlesex in August 1940, but moved with his family to Liverpool the following year.

Career 
Ken Brown was a member of the Les Stewart Quartet with Les Stewart, George Harrison, and Geoff Skinner. Mona Best opened The Casbah Coffee Club on 29 August 1959, and Brown arranged for the quartet to be its resident band. When Brown missed rehearsals to help decorate The Casbah, Stewart refused to play. Brown and Harrison recruited John Lennon and Paul McCartney at short notice to help them fulfil the residency, and used the name of The Quarrymen. They played a series of seven Saturday night engagements in The Casbah for 15 shillings each per night, starting on 29 August to October 1959, featuring Brown, Lennon, McCartney and Harrison, but without a drummer, and only one microphone connected to the club's small PA system. The opening night performance was attended by about 300 local teenagers, but as the cellar had no air-conditioning and people were dancing, the temperature rose to a level where it became hard to breathe.

Brown injured his leg on 10 October and it was agreed that he could not play, so he rested upstairs while the three future Beatles, Lennon, Harrison, and McCartney played the gig. Mona Best still divided the group's £3 fee (equivalent to £ in ) equally between the four of them. An argument ensued that meant Brown lost his place in the group.

Ken Brown formed the Blackjacks with Pete Best (the son of Mona Best) on drums and 'Chas' Newby. The group played at the Casbah until Pete Best was invited to join the Beatles just before their first 1960 trip to Hamburg in Germany. The Blackjacks disbanded and Brown moved to London. Brown never established himself as a professional musician.

Autobiography
Brown wrote an autobiography of his experiences initially called My Life and subsequently retitled Some Other Guy! The approximately 38,000-word manuscript never found a market and remains unpublished.

Death
Brown suffered from emphysema and died at his home in Essex aged 69. His body was discovered on 14 June 2010; police determined that he had died about five days earlier.

References

Bibliography

 }
 
 

1940 births
2010 deaths
People from Enfield, London
English rock guitarists
English autobiographers
The Quarrymen members
Musicians from Liverpool
Rhythm guitarists
Deaths from emphysema